Marrowbone Creek is a stream in Daviess County in the U.S. state of Missouri. It is a tributary of Honey Creek.

According to tradition, Marrowbone Creek was named from an incident when some frontiersmen cooked and ate copious amounts of elk bone marrow near the creek.

See also
List of rivers of Missouri

References

Rivers of Daviess County, Missouri
Rivers of Missouri